The 2022 Oceania Sevens Championship was held in Pukekohe, New Zealand on 24–26 June 2022. The event was the fourteenth Oceania Sevens tournament in men's rugby sevens. The competition was the final official tournament for Oceania Rugby national teams ahead of the Commonwealth Games Sevens in Birmingham. It was played as a double round-robin format at Navigation Homes Stadium. New Zealand won the tournament, with Australia VII Selection as runner-up.

Teams
Only four teams competed at the 2022 men's tournament, after Papua New Guinea was forced to withdraw due to travel logistics. The teams were:

Tournament
Each team's schedule mirrored the Commonwealth Games three-day format, with two matches played by each team per day. Each team played the other three teams twice. The highest ranked team after all matches were completed was declared the champion.

Standings

Round 1

Round 2

Round 3

Round 4

Round 5

Round 6

Placings
 
Source:

See also
 2022 Oceania Women's Sevens Championship

References

2022
2022 rugby sevens competitions
2022 in Oceanian rugby union
2022 in Australian rugby union
International rugby union competitions hosted by New Zealand
June 2022 sports events in New Zealand